Blue Lives Matter (also known as Police Lives Matter) is a countermovement in the United States advocating that those who are prosecuted and convicted of killing law enforcement officers should be sentenced under hate crime statutes. It emerged in 2014 as a reaction to the Black Lives Matter movement, and gained traction following the high-profile homicides of NYPD officers Rafael Ramos and Wenjian Liu in Brooklyn, New York.

Critics have pointed out that while being Black is an identity-based characteristic, being a police officer is a choice, and that police officers are already typically respected and honored in communities. They add that attacking or killing a police officer already carries a higher penalty than attacking a non-police officer, and argue that the movement is really more about suppressing minorities than supporting law enforcement.

History

On December 20, 2014, in the wake of the killings of officers Rafael Ramos and Wenjian Liu, a group of law enforcement officers formed Blue Lives Matter to counter media reports that they perceived to be anti-police. Blue Lives Matter is made up of active and retired law enforcement officers. The current national spokesman for Blue Lives Matter is retired Las Vegas Metropolitan Police Department Lieutenant Randy Sutton.

In September 2015, over 100 Los Angeles police officers took part in a Blue Lives Matter rally in Hollywood to "show support for the department at a time when [...] the ambush killings of police officers in cities elsewhere have left authorities across the nation feeling under siege."

Legislation

Louisiana
Despite criticism by the ACLU and others, including supporters of enhanced penalties for crimes against police officers, the Blue Lives Matter movement resulted in a state law in Louisiana (HB953) making it a hate crime to target police officers, firefighters, and emergency medical service personnel and exemplifying some of the movement's main problems. This law has been heavily criticized for weakening the impact of the Hate Crimes Act by adding categories of people who are already better protected under other laws and characterized by their career choice instead of people persecuted for lifelong personal characteristics they cannot choose such as race, sexual orientation, and gender identity. In addition, Louisiana's law was immediately invoked by law enforcement to enable more of the kind of serious overreach into the rights of citizens that both the police and the Blue Lives Matter movement have been criticized for. For example, false claims were immediately made that the law can be used to increase punishment for resisting arrest, despite this specifically not being a qualifying offense named in the law, which specifies the criteria battery and assault. Evidence that violence against police officers is decreasing has also been used to call into question the motivations for the law.

Louisiana passed legislation in May 2016, making it a hate crime to target police officers or firefighters. The legislation, authored by state Representative Lance Harris, was signed into law by Governor John Bel Edwards. The law allows for hate crime felonies to carry an additional $5,000 fine or five years in prison, while hate crime misdemeanors to carry an additional $500 fine or six months in prison.

Criticism

Some critics of Blue Lives Matter state that one's job does not have the deep identity significance and source of solidarity that one's racial identity can. Others state that Black identity and history is constantly under threat of erasure while police officers do not face this threat. Another source of criticism is the belief that African Americans in urban areas are unfairly suspected of being thieves and freeloaders, while police officers are typically respected and honored in communities. Some state that supporters of Blue Lives Matter are intentionally or unintentionally supporting a system of discriminatory policing and racial profiling.

Some critics of Blue Lives Matter laws state the laws are redundant as attacking or killing a police officer would already result in a harsher punishment than attacking a non-police officer.

Others, such as St. Martinville Police Chief, Calder Hebert, say these laws will make resisting arrest a hate crime which has drawn criticism as hate crimes are crimes in which victims are targeted because of identity-based characteristics such as race, sexual orientation, or gender. According to FBI data, violence against police officers, as well as crime in general has decreased without these laws; calling into question their necessity.

Following the 2021 United States Capitol attack many have called Blue Lives Matter hypocritical as many in the mob were showing support for Blue Lives Matter, yet they assaulted capitol police officers. One African-American Capitol Police Officer even described being beaten with a Blue Lives Matter flag. This has led some to argue that Blue Lives Matter is more about suppressing minorities than supporting law enforcement.

See also
 A.C.A.B.
 All Lives Matter

References

External links

American police officers killed in the line of duty
American political catchphrases
Black Lives Matter
2010s in the United States
2014 establishments in New York City
African-American-related controversies
Law enforcement controversies in the United States
2010s controversies in the United States
Hashtags